Tyler August (born January 26, 1983) is an American politician and legislator. He is the Speaker pro tempore of the Wisconsin State Assembly, since 2013.  A Republican, he was first elected to the Assembly in 2010, representing eastern Walworth County.

Early life and education

Born in Walworth County, Wisconsin, August graduated from Big Foot High School, in Walworth, Wisconsin, in 2001.  He attended the University of Wisconsin–Eau Claire and the University of Wisconsin–Madison, but did not obtain a degree.  He completed a leadership program at the University of Virginia's Darden School of Business in 2012.

Career

August first became active in state government by working on the staff of state representative Thomas Lothian, his predecessor in the Assembly, and is now a full-time legislator. He has been active with the Republican Party of Wisconsin, serving on the executive board of the state party, as well as serving as Chair for the Republican Party in Walworth County and in Wisconsin's 1st congressional district.  He is also a lifetime member of the National Rifle Association.

2010 election

August was first elected to the Assembly in 2010, where his main challenge was the hotly contested six-way Republican primary.  On the night of the primary, Adam Gibbs, the 24-year-old son of former Wisconsin circuit court judge Michael Gibbs, was declared the winner by a mere four votes.  After a dramatic recount, August was ultimately ruled to be the winner by a margin of three votes.  August subsequently won the general election with 58% of the vote.

Assembly Speaker pro tempore

In 2013, when Republican Assembly Majority Leader Scott Suder resigned his seat in the Assembly to accept an appointment from Governor Scott Walker, the Republican conference selected Bill Kramer, the Speaker pro tempore, to replace him.  They then elected Tyler August, at the time in just his second term, to become the new Speaker pro tempore.  He was subsequently re-elected by the conference at the start of the next three legislative sessions.

In the current term, August serves on the Committees on Assembly Organization, Government Accountability and Oversight, Insurance, Rules, and Law Revision.  He is co-chair of the Joint Survey Committee on Tax Exemptions, and also serves on the Joint Legislative Council and the Speaker's Task Force on Adoption.

In November 2020, August was re-elected to his role as Assembly Speaker Pro Tempore.

In June 2022, Governor Tony Evers called for a special session to pass laws which would have legalized abortion in Wisconsin until viability. Abortion was banned in Wisconsin earlier in the month after the Supreme Court of the United States decided that the Constitution of the United States did not confer the right to abortion. This decision triggered the implementation of an 1849 state law that banned abortion, except to protect the life of the mother. However, August and other Republicans in the Legislature gaveled the special session in and out, keeping abortion illegal in the state.

Assembly Majority Leader 
August was elected as Majority Leader of the Assembly on November 10, 2022, replacing Jim Steineke, who resigned on July 27, 2022. He was replaced as Speaker pro tempore by Kevin Petersen.

Electoral history

Wisconsin Assembly (2010)

| colspan="6" style="text-align:center;background-color: #e9e9e9;"| Republican Primary, September 14, 2010

| colspan="6" style="text-align:center;background-color: #e9e9e9;"| General Election, November 2, 2010

Wisconsin Assembly (2012, 2014, 2016, 2018)

| colspan="6" style="text-align:center;background-color: #e9e9e9;"| General Election, November 6, 2012

| colspan="6" style="text-align:center;background-color: #e9e9e9;"| General Election, November 4, 2014

| colspan="6" style="text-align:center;background-color: #e9e9e9;"| General Election, November 8, 2016

| colspan="6" style="text-align:center;background-color: #e9e9e9;"| General Election, November 6, 2018

References

External links
 Representative Tyler August - Speaker Pro Tempore at Wisconsin Legislature
 Tyler August for State Assembly (Campaign website)
 
 

|-

1983 births
21st-century American politicians
Living people
People from Lake Geneva, Wisconsin
People from Walworth County, Wisconsin
Republican Party members of the Wisconsin State Assembly
University of Wisconsin–Eau Claire alumni
University of Wisconsin–Madison alumni